Abhishek Chowdhury (born 4 October 1983) is an Indian former cricketer. He played one first-class match for Bengal in 2010.

See also
 List of Bengal cricketers

References

External links
 

1983 births
Living people
Indian cricketers
Bengal cricketers
People from Jalpaiguri district